Chrysorabdia vilemani is a moth of the subfamily Arctiinae. It is found in Taiwan.

References

Moths described in 1911
Lithosiini
Moths of Taiwan